Tiwari Bhanjyang is a village development committee in Bhojpur District in the Kosi Zone of eastern Nepal. At the time of the 1991 Nepal census it had a population of 3004 persons living in 534 individual households. The mayor of this VDC is Manit Nidhi Tiwari.

References

External links
UN map of the municipalities of Bhojpur District

Populated places in Bhojpur District, Nepal